Alfred Badu Nkansah is a Ghanaian politician and teacher. He was the member of parliament for the Asunafo constituency during the second republic of Ghana.

Early life and education 
Nkansah was born on 11 January 1936. He attended the Berekum Training College and the Peki Training College where he obtained his Teachers' Training Certificate. He later entered the University of Ghana where he was awarded his Bachelor of Arts degree in history.

Career and Politics 
Nkansah's political career begun when he was nominated member of the constituent assembly for two constituencies Asunafo and Asutifi in a tripartite competition. Nkansah was sworn into office as a member of parliament on 1 October 1969, following his election during the 1969 Ghanaian parliamentary general election. He served as a member of parliament for the Asunafo Constituency on the ticket of the Progress Party from 1969 to 1972 when the Busia government was overthrown. In 1979, he was a member of the Legislative Assembly but was later expelled by the Privilege Committee of the assembly for being absent for five consecutive days without permission. That same year, he was elected member of parliament for the Asunafo Constituency on the ticket of the Popular Front Party. He served in this capacity from 1979 until the 31 December 1981 when the Limann government was overthrown.

Religion 
Nkansah is a Christian

References

1936 births
Ghanaian MPs 1969–1972
University of Ghana
Progress Party (Ghana) politicians
20th-century Ghanaian politicians
Living people
People from Brong-Ahafo Region
Ghanaian Christians